The Beijing Municipal Public Security Bureau is a department of the municipal government of Beijing. It serves as the city's public security bureau and branch of the people's police under the Ministry of Public Security (MPS) The headquarters is in Qianmen, Dongcheng District.

In 2010, the agency started a new public relations program by allowing Hong Kong and Macau media to attend press conferences and adding new spokespersons.
All police officers of the Beijing police are armed with a variety of guns on the beat, e.g. QSZ-92, QSW-06,  officers in special units carry shotguns and SWAT members are armed with the domestically produced Norinco QBZ-95 Assault Rifle and QSZ-92 Pistols. The bureau is the host of Beijing SWAT, reportedly one of the most well trained and best equipped special police (特警 , "Tèjǐng") teams in the entire country.

History

 On

See also
 Beijing Municipal Administration of Prisons
 On the Beat, a 1995 film depicting officers of the Beijing Public Municipal Security Bureau  (PSB)

References

External links
 

Law enforcement agencies of China
Dongcheng District, Beijing
Politics of Beijing